Crotalus oreganus, commonly known as the (northern) Pacific rattlesnake, is a venomous pit viper species found in western North America from the Baja California Peninsula to the southern interior of British Columbia.

Description
The size of this species varies greatly, with some populations being stunted and others growing very large. Mainland specimens often reach  in length, with the largest on record being  (Klauber, 1956) for C. o. oreganus.

This species, in its various forms, shows considerable ontogenetic variation. Juveniles usually have more or less distinct patterns, but these fade as the animals mature. The color of the iris often matches the ground color, which may be bronze, gold, or different shades of tan, pink, or gray.

The color pattern of the typical form, C. o. oreganus, has a dark-brown, dark-gray, olive-brown, or sometimes black or pale yellowish ground color overlaid dorsally with a series of large, dark blotches with uneven white edges. These blotches are also wider than the spaces that separate them. Additionally, a lateral series of blotches, usually darker than the dorsal blotches, is clearly visible on all but the darkest specimens. The first rings of the tail are about the same color as the last body blotches, but these rings become progressively darker; the last two rings, at the base of the tail, are usually black. The belly is pale yellow, usually with brown spots. A large, dark-brown blotch on the snout has a pale border behind it that forms transverse bars on the supraoculars. There is a dark brown postocular stripe with a white border that extends from the eye to around the angle of the jaw.

Common names
Efforts to standardize the common names of North American reptiles and amphibians began as early as 1956, and the name "Northern Pacific Rattlesnake" was applied to Crotalus viridis oreganus with wide acceptance. Following subsequent taxonomic changes, and depending on various taxonomic arrangements, the names "Northern Pacific Rattlesnake" or "Western Rattlesnake" have been applied with high levels of consistency and acceptance (largely depending on which arrangement, and recognition of subspecies if any, in the Crotalus viridis complex are followed), although occasionally appearing in slight variations, e.g. north Pacific rattlesnake.

Geographic range
It is found in North America from southwestern Canada, through much of the western half of the United States, to the Baja California Peninsula of Mexico. In Canada, it is found in southern interior of British Columbia and is one of only three remaining rattlesnake species in the country. In the United States, it occurs in Washington, Oregon, California, western and southern Idaho, Nevada, Utah, Arizona, western Colorado, and small parts of New Mexico and Wyoming. In Mexico, it occurs in Baja California and the northern extreme of Baja California Sur.

Ecology and natural history

Diet

Using its heat-sensing facial pits to locate prey, C. oreganus eats birds, bird eggs, and small mammals, from mice to rabbits. It also eats small reptiles and amphibians.  The juveniles eat insects.

Reproduction
Males reach sexual maturity in two to four years, with most reproducing for the first time in their third year. Females in contrast mature in three to seven years, with most first reproducing in their fourth year, however northern populations in British Columbia are known to first reproduce as late as their sixth, seventh, or eighth year. The reproductive cycle of females is normally biennial, although 10% may produce litters in two consecutive years, and one case of a three year interval has been reported. Crotalus oreganus typically mate in the spring after emerging from winter dormancy, although British Columbia populations have been reported to mate in the fall before dormancy. The gestation period was reported to be about 90 days in wild snakes from Idaho, but periods of 143 and 425 days have been reported for individuals in captivity. Females usually fast while they are gravid. They are viviparous, producing live young. Parturition of 1–15 (average 3–8) young usually occurs in August or September, with neonates ranging 19–28 cm. (average 25.2 cm.) in total length. One report of 25 young is regarded as questionable by some herpetologist.   

Mating usually takes place in concealed areas, like burrows, crevices of rocks and logs, or dense brush. Mating snakes are highly sensitive to disturbance and are quick to separate.

Conservation status
This species is classified as Least Concern on the IUCN Red List of Threatened Species (v3.1, 2001). Species are listed as such due to their wide distribution, presumed large population, or because they are unlikely to be declining fast enough to qualify for listing in a more threatened category. The population trend was stable when assessed in 2007.

References

Further reading
 Holbrook, J.E. 1840. North American Herpetology; or, A Description of the Reptiles Inhabiting the United States. Vol. IV. [First Edition.] Dobson. Philadelphia. 126 pp. (Crotalus oreganus, pp. 115–117.)

External links

 

oreganus
Snakes of North America
Reptiles of Canada
Reptiles of the United States
Fauna of the Western United States
Fauna of California
Fauna of the Rocky Mountains
Articles containing video clips
Reptiles described in 1840